This article contains a list of the most studied restriction enzymes whose names start with T to Z inclusive.  It contains approximately 70 enzymes.

The following information is given:

Whole list navigation

Restriction enzymes

T

U

V

X

Y

Z

Notes

Biotechnology
Restriction enzyme cutting sites
Restriction enzymes